Supply-chain-management software (SCMS) is the software tools or modules used in executing supply chain transactions, managing supplier relationships and controlling associated business processes. Supply chain management maximizes the efficiency of business activities that include planning and management of the entire supply chain. It helps businesses in product development, sourcing, production, and logistics by automating operations. In this way, it increases the physical flow of business as well as informative flow. The entire business benefits with higher performance, greater cost-efficiency, and thus increased supply chain efficiency..

While functionality in such systems is broad, it commonly includes:

 Customer-requirement processing
 Purchase-order processing
 Sales and distribution
 Inventory management
 Goods receipt and warehouse management
 Supplier management/sourcing

A requirement of many SCMS often includes forecasting. Such tools often attempt to balance the disparity between supply and demand by improving business processes and using algorithms and consumption analysis to better plan future needs.  SCMS also often includes integration technology that allows organizations to trade electronically with supply chain partners.

ℂ==Shift to SaaS==
SCMS adoption is growing faster than the broader enterprise application software market. The annual revenue from SCMS (on-premises and SaaS) reached $10 billion in 2014, a 12 percent increase over 2013.

While premises-based software was still more widely used than SaaS solutions for SCMS in 2014, Gartner projects that about two-thirds of the growth in SCMS adoption between 2015 and 2018 will be based on the SaaS subscription model: driven by a growing realization of the benefits of cloud-based services, the SaaS-based SCMS market grew by about 24 percent in 2014 and is projected to continue to grow at a 19 percent compound annual growth rate (CAGR), reaching $4.4 billion in annual sales by 2018.

References

Supply chain management